The Shawnee Hills AVA is an American Viticultural Area located between the Mississippi River and the Ohio River in southern Illinois.

The AVA was created as a result of the successful petition of Ted Wichmann, owner of Owl Creek Vineyard.  The area is named after the Shawnee, a Native American nation that settled in Southern Illinois in the mid 18th century.  The AVA is served by the Shawnee Hills Wine Trail.

Wineries 

At least 20 wineries as well as additional vineyards produced wine and grow grapes within the Shawnee Hills AVA. Most of the wineries are aligned with the Shawnee Hills Wine Trail in the southwestern portion of the AVA (south of Route 13 and west of Interstate 57). The Southern Illinois Wine Trail (east of Interstate 57) includes the next largest grouping, as well as some wineries located just outside the AVA. The area around Kinkaid Lake in the northwestern corner of the AVA is also seeing a number of new wineries develop.

Economic impact of wine trail 

As early as 1999, the Illinois Grape and Wine Resources Council estimated the wine trail's products provided more than $1 million boost to the area economy. By 2001, the wine trail had grown to five wineries producing more than 150,000 bottles.  In November 2010, Gary Orlandini Vineyards used "leaps and bounds" to describe the growth of the wine trail, explaining the wineries along the trail had averaged 28 percent annual growth since the mid-1990s when the trail first organized.

The development of the wineries has also boosted the region's hospitality industry with around four dozen specialty lodging facilities – bed and breakfast inns, cabins and vacation rentals – all but the state-owned Giant City Lodge and one or two others opening in the last 15 years. These don't count the new motels and hotels in Carbondale, Illinois, on the north edge of the wine trail.

Research from around 2010 showed that approximately 40 percent of the visitors to the wine trail were non-local (defined as coming from at least 50 miles away). Tourists attracted to the wine trail tended to be older and possessed a higher household income than local wine visitors. Sixty-five percent of the tourists were between the ages of 32 and 59, and another 15 percent were 60 or older. Also, 65 percent had household incomes above $75,000.

See also
Blue Sky Vineyards
 Shawnee Hills Wine Trail

References

Geography of Alexander County, Illinois
American Viticultural Areas
Geography of Gallatin County, Illinois
Geography of Hardin County, Illinois
Illinois wine
Geography of Jackson County, Illinois
Geography of Johnson County, Illinois
Geography of Pope County, Illinois
Geography of Pulaski County, Illinois
Geography of Randolph County, Illinois
Geography of Saline County, Illinois
Geography of Union County, Illinois
Geography of Williamson County, Illinois
2006 establishments in Illinois